The 1935 Delaware Fightin' Blue Hens football team was an American football team that represented the University of Delaware in the 1935 college football season. In their first season under head coach Lyal Clark, the Blue Hens compiled a 2–5–1 record and were outscored by a total of 117 to 69. The team played its home games at Frazer Field in Newark, Delaware.

Schedule

References

Delaware
Delaware Fightin' Blue Hens football seasons
Delaware Fightin' Blue Hens football